Tvorog is a white cheese. This is a non-liquid white fermented milk product, traditional for Eastern, Northern and (less often) Central Europe, obtained by fermenting milk with subsequent serum removal. It is officially customary to classify Tvorog produced in the traditional way, according to its fat content. According to GOST RF, according to physical and chemical indicators, Tvorog is divided into the following categories: fat-free, low-fat, classic and fatty. Also, according to the method of manufacture, such types of Tvorog are distinguished as simple, soft, and grained Tvorog, which is a type of low-fat Tvorog.

A milk-containing product with a milk fat substitute, produced in accordance with the technology for the production of Tvorog, is called not Творог, but a curd product. In Germany, for example, Quark is produced with linseed oil, which contains less than 0.5% of animal fats, and hence cholesterol, but contains unsaturated fatty acids, such as alpha-linolenic acid. Therefore, such a product may be useful for the prevention of cardiovascular diseases.

On the territory of the former USSR, Tvorog is made and directly consumed fresh or sweet, in other countries of Eastern and Central Europe - fresh or brackish, in Northern Europe - brackish. Cottage cheese is consumed to a small extent in Great Britain, North America, Japan and is almost completely absent in Southern Europe and other parts of the world.

In English-speaking culture, cottage cheese is considered a type of young soft cheese, while in modern Russian-speaking environments, Tvorog is usually not considered a type of cheese.

Etymology and stress 

Comes from Proto Slavic tvarog  - from the same basis as to create, that is, processed milk.

Many dictionaries indicate two stresses in the word "Творог", however, in normalized speech, in particular on radio and television, as well as in a number of reference books, the stress on the second syllable is considered preferable.

Types of Tvorog 
According to the method of preparation (production) there are two ways to produce Tvorog - traditional (regular) and separate.

According to the method of coagulation of milk proteins in the traditional way, Tvorog is divided into acid and acid-rennet.

 Sour curd is usually made from skimmed milk. In this case, the protein coagulates under the action of lactic acid, which is formed in the process of lactic acid fermentation, which develops as a result of adding starter cultures to milk.
 Acid-rennet curd differs from acid curd in that during its production, rennet (or pepsin) and starter cultures of lactic acid bacteria are used simultaneously to coagulate milk proteins.

 The separate method differs from the usual one in that the purified milk is separated in order to obtain skimmed milk and cream, the mass fraction of fat in which is 50-55%. Fat-free Tvorog is obtained from skimmed milk. In this case, acid-rennet coagulation of milk proteins is used to obtain a clot. Fat-free Tvorog is cooled and mixed with cream.

 By properties
 Fat (19-23%)
 Classic (4-18%)
 Bold (non-greasy)(1.8%)
 Fat-free

 By fillers
 With additives (raisins, dried fruits, nuts, candied fruits, chocolate chips, etc.)
 Calcined

Manufacture 
The traditional way of making Tvorog involves the use of fermented milk with the separation (squeezing) of liquid whey in free-hanging bags. The finished Творог has a dense texture, smooth edges on the break, the separated whey is transparent, slightly greenish in color. When using fermented milk, the curd will turn out sour.

The process of industrial production of Tvorog looks like this: milk is normalized (the desired fat content is set), pasteurized and poured into baths (containers). The baths maintain a certain temperature (28-30 °C), which is necessary for the normal course of processes. Ferment and pepsin are added to warm milk. After some time (the average fermentation time is 8 hours), a curd grain is formed in the bath, which forms a monolith (milk proteins coagulate and precipitate, forming a sticky mass). Serum begins to separate - a clear yellowish liquid, a by-product of production. At the final stage, the curd monolith is cut with strings into small pieces in order to increase the surface area and facilitate the outflow of whey. Next, the curd grain is squeezed and cooled. At the end of the technological process, the curd is packaged.

Nutrition 
According to the 1981 Dietetic Handbook, Tvorog contains:

Consumption 
Before using Tvorog for making culinary dishes, it is usually rubbed or passed through a meat grinder. Dishes containing Tvorog are cooked boiled, baked, fried. Actually Tvorog is often served with sour cream, fermented baked milk, fruits, berries, honey or sweet sauce.

 Syrniki
 Vatrushka
 cheesecake
 Vareniki
 Easter Paskha
 Cottage cheese casserole
 Syrok (Творожный сырок Curd cheese, often glazed with chocolate)
 Kurut (dry cottage cheese in Kyrgyzstan, Kazakhstan )

Use in clinical nutrition 

Tvorog is one of the richest sources of complete protein.  Due to denaturation, milk protein becomes more available for cleavage by proteolytic enzymes, so Tvorog is easily digested.

Tvorog contains a large amount of calcium in an easily digestible form, as well as vitamins B1, B2, PP, C and others. Promotes the formation of hemoglobin, improves the regenerative capacity of the nervous system, strengthens bone and cartilage tissue .

It has a pronounced diuretic effect.

It has been experimentally established that several times less gastric juice, hydrochloric acid and enzymes are released on Творог than on fermented and whole milk.

In view of the foregoing, Tvorog is very widely used in dietary, as well as children's and sports nutrition, as well as in diets in the treatment of obesity, heart disease, liver disease, atherosclerosis and hypertension, as it has a lipotropic property (improves fat metabolism).

Use in religious rituals 

 Christian church of the first centuries
In a number of Christian churches of the first centuries there were ritual prohibitions on the use of Tvorog in the summer.

In the "Apostolic Tradition"  - the manual of the first Christians - there are ritual formulas with a play on words, pronounced during the consecration of Творог: "Sanctify this milk that has curdled, and sanctify us, binding with your love."

 Russian Orthodox ChurchMain article Easter (dish)

In the central and northern regions of Russia, there is a custom to prepare a special dish of Tvorog for Easter - Paskha, which is consecrated in the church.

See also 
 List of Russian dishes
 List of fermented foods
 List of cheese

References

Notes

Sources

Literature 
 Cottage cheese // Commodity Dictionary / I. A. Pugachev (editor-in-chief). - M . : State publishing house of trade literature, 1960. - T. VIII. - Stb. 671-673. — 630 p

External links 
 Change of stress in the word "cottage cheese" from the 18th to the 21st centuries, according to the materials of the dictionaries of the Russian language
 Interstate standard - Cottage cheese - GOST 31453-2013
Russian cheeses
Cottage cheese